Dorinda Clark-Cole  is the debut album of Gospel singer Dorinda Clark-Cole, which was released on June 25, 2002.

Dorinda won two Stellar Awards and a Soul Train Lady of Soul Award for Best Female Gospel Artist from the album.

A DVD was later released entitled Dorinda Clark-Cole Live. The DVD is a live recording that was recorded at New Birth Cathedral in Atlanta. The track listing of the DVD includes most of the songs on the original studio album.

Track listing 
 If It Had Not Been For The Lord* − 3:51
 No Not One (feat. J. Moss) − 4:18
 I'm Coming Out* − 5:46
 I'm Coming Out (Reprise)* − 2:17
 You Can't Take My Joy* − 5:45
 Show Me The Way (with The Clark Sisters)* − 4:12
 You Can't Hurry God* − 5:41
 It's Not Me − 3:24
 I'm Still Here* − 5:52
 Nobody Like Jesus* − 5:09
 You Don't Have To Leave Here* − 5:41
 You Don't Have To Leave Here (Reprise)* − 2:41
 You Can − 3:57
 You Need Him (hidden bonus track) − 4:00

Songs with stars were recorded live at the Bailey Cathedral in Detroit, Michigan.

Chart history

References 

Dorinda Clark-Cole albums
2002 debut albums
GospoCentric Records albums